Laevicaulis stuhlmanni is a species of terrestrial, nocturnal slug in the family Veronicellidae. It is native to parts of tropical Africa.

Description 
Laevicaulis stuhlmanni shows a flattened body and a dark to light brown colour. Adults are on average 45 mm long and 15.5 mm wide. The weight of an adult averages around 3.5 g.

Feeding habits 
Laevicaulis stuhlmanni is a grazer and detritus feeder.

Distribution 
Laevicaulis stuhlmanni occurs naturally in tropical regions of Africa, including Congo Kenya, Tanzania and Uganda. It has been introduced to Egypt, where it is viewed as a serious agricultural pest.

Life cycle 
In Egypt the reproductive season of Leavicaulis stuhlmanni starts in March or April, when the temperature rises, and lasts until November.  They are hermaphrodites and self-fertilization is common. During the oviposition period each slug can produce 5 clutches over the course of 46 days. Under laboratory conditions Leavicaulis stuhlmanni lays individual egg clutches containing up to 140 oval to spherical elongated, clear translucent eggs. The clutch is covered with a soil-rich fecal pellet-ribbon that helps maintain a high humidity within it. Incubation period ranges from 10 to 19 days at a temperature of around 30°C and a humidtiy between 52 % and 64 %. Laevicaulis stuhlmanni reaches sexual maturity after 2 to 3 months after hatching, depending on climatic conditions. Total life span is between 5 and 6 months.

References 

Veronicellidae